Kulpa is a rural locality (a settlement) in Biryukovsky Selsoviet, Privolzhsky District, Astrakhan Oblast, Russia. The population was 149 as of 2010. There are 3 streets.

Geography 
Kulpa is located 17 km southeast of Nachalovo (the district's administrative centre) by road. Akhterek is the nearest rural locality.

References 

Rural localities in Privolzhsky District, Astrakhan Oblast